The 2014 Knoxville Challenger was a professional tennis tournament played on indoor hard courts. It was the eleventh edition of the tournament, which was part of the 2014 ATP Challenger Tour. It took place in Knoxville, United States between 4 and 9 November 2014.

Singles main-draw entrants

Seeds

 1 Rankings are as of October 27, 2014.

Other entrants
The following players received wildcards into the singles main draw:
  Jared Donaldson
  Miķelis Lībietis
  Daniel Nguyen
  Hunter Reese

The following player received entry as a special exemption into the singles main draw:
  Liam Broady

The following players received entry as an alternate into the singles main draw:
  Gianni Mina

The following players received entry from the qualifying draw:
  Sekou Bangoura
  Eric Quigley
  Tennys Sandgren
  Marcus Willis

The following players received entry into the singles main draw as lucky losers:
  Marcelo Arévalo

Champions

Singles

 Adrian Mannarino def.  Sam Groth 3–6, 7–6(8–6), 6–4

Doubles

 Miķelis Lībietis /  Hunter Reese def.  Gastão Elias /  Sean Thornley 6–3, 6–4

External links
Official Website

Knoxville Challenger
Knoxville Challenger
2014 in American tennis
2014 in sports in Tennessee